Money on the Side is a 1982 American made-for-television drama film starring Karen Valentine, Jamie Lee Curtis and Linda Purl as three women who become prostitutes, working for madam Karen Gordon (Susan Flannery).

Plot
Janice Vernon (Valetine) is married to traveling salesman Nelson (Richard Masur), and has a son with special needs. The couple are experiencing severe financial hardships, and Janice lists her home for sale by Karen's Gordon's realty firm. When her house doesn't sell, Karen offers Janice a way to become a prostitute. Janice feels she can't do it, but eventually the need for money overcomes her feelings and she begins working as an "escort" for Karen.
Michelle Jamison (Curtis) is a highly educated secretary that likes the thrill of hooking. She sees it as being in control. Her estranged husband has a drinking problem, and she uses some of the money she earns as a prostitute to fix her car after her husband wrecks it while driving drunk.
Annie Gilson (Linda Purl) is studying for her real estate license with Karen Gordon, and is also saving her money to buy a house. She is married and has a young daughter, but her husband has no idea she turns tricks on the side. 
The three women become friends as they work together. The police are aware of Karen's firm being a front for her escort business, and eventually she is arrested, along with her working girls. Annie commits suicide by hanging herself in jail. Janice tries to explain to her husband that she did what she felt she had to do. She tells him, "we're just people," but he still leaves her.

Cast
 Karen Valentine as Janice Vernon
 Jamie Lee Curtis as Michelle Jamison
 Linda Purl as Annie Gilson
 Christopher Lloyd as Sergeant Stampone
 Richard Masur as Nelson Vernon
 Gary Graham as Jack Gilson
 Edward Edwards as Paul
 John Bennett Perry as Tom Westmore
 Joe Lambie as Chip Jamison
 Susan Flannery as Karen Gordon
 Arthur Rosenberg as Mason Hutchons
 Lee de Broux as Claude
 Terry Burns as Louis
 John H. Fields as Judge Evans
 Sarina C. Grant as Nina
 Pat Studstill as Cowboy
 Kenneth Washington as Detective White
 Adele Rosse as Mrs. Gersh
 Mary McDonnell as Terri
 Micole Mercurio as Donna Pallizzano

External links
 

1982 films
1982 television films
1982 drama films
Films about prostitution in the United States
Films directed by Robert L. Collins
American drama television films
1980s English-language films
1980s American films